Renate Habinger (born 11 August 1957, in Sankt Pölten) is an Austrian graphic artist and illustrator. Habinger studied graphic design at the Federal Institute of Graphic Arts and Design (1971-1975) and since then, she has been working as a freelance artist. In 1997, she set up the workshop the "Schneiderhäusl" in Oberndorf an der Melk.

Awards
1993:  for Meistererzählungen von Hans Christian Andersen
2000:  159 for Es war einmal von A bis Zett
2004: Nomination for the Deutscher Jugendliteraturpreis (German Youth Literature Prize) for Neun nackte Nilpferddamen (by Gerda Anger-Schmidt)
2006: 
2007:  for Gaggalagu (together with Michael Stavarič)
2009: Austrian State Prize for Children's and Youth Literature for Biebu (together with Michael Stavarič)
2012: Nomination for the Hans Christian Andersen Award for her complete works
2012: Austrian State Prize for Children's and Youth Literature for Lions (together with Michael Stavarič)

References

External links

1957 births
Living people
20th-century Austrian women artists
21st-century Austrian women artists
Austrian illustrators
Austrian graphic designers